Delafosse or Delafose is a French surname.  Notable people with this name include:

Geno Delafose (born 1972), American Zydeco musician, son of John Delafose
John Delafose (1939–1994), American Zydeco musician
Maurice Delafosse (1870–1926), French ethnographer and colonial official

See also
De la Fosse

French-language surnames